Juan Camilo Novoa Aguinaga (born October 5, 1981) is Colombian professional boxer. As an amateur, he won a gold medal at the 2002 Central American and Caribbean Games at junior middleweight vs Juan Ubaldo. He is nicknamed "La Boa".

Amateur career
He qualified for the Olympic Games by ending up in first place at the 2nd AIBA American 2004 Olympic Qualifying Tournament in Rio de Janeiro, Brazil. He moved down to welterweight to participate in the 2004 Summer Olympics for his native country. There he was beaten in the quarterfinals of the welterweight (69 kg) division by Korea's Kim Jung Joo.

Professional career
He turned professional at middleweight and is 12-1, the loss being a stoppage defeat in the first round.

External links

1981 births
Living people
Colombian male boxers
Olympic boxers of Colombia
Boxers at the 2004 Summer Olympics
Central American and Caribbean Games gold medalists for Colombia
Competitors at the 2002 Central American and Caribbean Games
Sportspeople from Antioquia Department
Welterweight boxers
Central American and Caribbean Games medalists in boxing
20th-century Colombian people
21st-century Colombian people